Punk Parranda (English: Punk Party) is the first live album by Spanish alternative rock band Bongo Botrako. It was recorded on May 2, 2014 at Viña Rock Festival in Villarrobledo, Spain, in front of a crowd of more than 60,000 people. The album was produced by Gambeat and lead vocalist Uri Giné, and was released on November 3, 2014 on Kasba Music.

Track listing

Personnel

Credits adapted from the liner notes of Punk Parranda.

Bongo Botrako
 Uri Giné – lead vocals, guitar, production
 Nacho Pascual – guitar, backing vocals
 Xavi Vallverdú – keyboard, backing vocals
 David Garcia – bass, backing vocals
 Gorka Robert – drums, backing vocals
 Xavi Barrero – trumpet, backing vocals
 Oscar Gómez – sax, backing vocals

Production
 Gambeat – production
 Kaki Arkarazo – engineering, mixing
 Jonan Ordorika – mastering

Design
 Luis Toledo – design
 Javier Rosa – photography

References

2014 live albums
Bongo Botrako albums